In planetary geology, a mensa  (pl. mensae ) is a flat-topped prominence with cliff-like edges. The term is derived from the Latin word for table, and has the same root as the Spanish word for table, mesa. Mensa is used in the same manner as mesa is used in the Southwest United States.

References

Planetary geology
Extraterrestrial mesas